Ahmed El-Nagar (born 19 February 1964) is an Egyptian boxer. He competed at the 1984 Summer Olympics and the 1988 Summer Olympics.

References

External links
 

1964 births
Living people
Egyptian male boxers
Olympic boxers of Egypt
Boxers at the 1984 Summer Olympics
Boxers at the 1988 Summer Olympics
Place of birth missing (living people)
Light-heavyweight boxers
20th-century Egyptian people